Justice Coke may refer to:

James Leslie Coke, associate justice of the Supreme Court of Hawaii
Richard Coke, associate justice of the Supreme Court of Texas

See also
Justice Cook (disambiguation)